In mathematics, in the realm of topology, a paranormal space  is a topological space in which every countable discrete collection of closed sets has a locally finite open expansion.

See also

 
 
 
  – a topological space in which every two disjoint closed sets have disjoint open neighborhoods
  – a topological space in which every open cover admits an open locally finite refinement

References

 
 

Properties of topological spaces